The Ven. Charles Edward Blakeway (1868-1922) was Archdeacon of Stafford from 1911 until his death.

Blakeway was educated at Shrewsbury School and Christ Church, Oxford; and ordained in 1897.

He was an Assistant Master at Malvern College from 1898 until 1900; and Curate of Great Malvern from 1900 until 1902.

Notes

1868 births
People educated at Shrewsbury School
Alumni of Christ Church, Oxford
Archdeacons of Stafford
1922 deaths